The 1938 United States Senate election in Arkansas took place on November 8, 1938. Incumbent Senator Hattie Caraway ran for a second term in office. After narrowly defeating U.S. Representative John Little McClellan in the Democratic primary, she easily won the general election over Republican C.D. Atkinson.

Caraway, already the first woman elected to the U.S. Senate, became the first woman elected to a second term in office.

Democratic primary

Candidates
Hattie Caraway, incumbent U.S. Senator since 1931
John L. McClellan, U.S. Representative
J. Rosser Venable

Results

General election

Results

See also
1938 United States Senate elections

References 

1938
Arkansas
United States Senate